M&E may refer to:

Morris and Essex Railroad
Morris & Essex Lines
Morristown and Erie Railway
Monitoring and Evaluation
Electromechanics, combines mechanical engineering and electrical engineering
Mechatronics, a portmanteau of mechanics and electronics
Machinery and Equipment (accounting)
Meals and Entertainment (accounting)